SNK (formerly Shin Nihon Kikaku), a Japanese video game company and former electronic game manufacturer. This may also refer to:

 SNK European Democrats
 SNK Union of Independents
 Southeast Airlines ICAO code
 Sovnarkom, the Soviet Council of People's Commissars (Sovet Narodnykh Komissarov)
 The Student-Newman–Keuls method in statistics
 Soninke language (ISO 639-2 language code)
Shingeki no Kyojin, the Japanese name of the manga and anime series Attack on Titan